Fluorescein is an organic compound and dye based on the xanthene tricyclic structural motif, formally belonging to triarylmethine dyes family. It is available as a dark orange/red powder slightly soluble in water and alcohol. It is widely used as a fluorescent tracer for many applications.

The color of its aqueous solutions is green by reflection and orange by transmission (its spectral properties are dependent on pH of the solution), as can be noticed in bubble levels, for example, in which fluorescein is added as a colorant to the alcohol filling the tube in order to increase the visibility of the air bubble contained within (thus enhancing the precision of the instrument). More concentrated solutions of fluorescein can even appear red (because under these conditions nearly all incident emission is re-absorbed by the solution).

It is on the World Health Organization's List of Essential Medicines.

Uses 

Fluorescein sodium, the sodium salt of fluorescein, is used extensively as a diagnostic tool in the field of ophthalmology and optometry, where topical fluorescein is used in the diagnosis of corneal abrasions, corneal ulcers and herpetic corneal infections.  It is also used in rigid gas permeable contact lens fitting to evaluate the tear layer under the lens. It is available as sterile single-use sachets containing lint-free paper applicators soaked in fluorescein sodium solution.

The thyroxine ester of fluorescein is used to quantify the thyroxine concentration in blood.

Fluorescein is also known as a color additive (D&C Yellow no. 7). The disodium salt form of fluorescein is known as uranine or D&C Yellow no. 8.

Fluorescein is a precursor to the red dye eosin Y by bromination.

Safety 
Oral and intravenous use of fluorescein can cause adverse reactions, including nausea, vomiting, hives, acute hypotension, anaphylaxis and related anaphylactoid reaction, causing cardiac arrest and sudden death due to anaphylactic shock.

Intravenous use has the most reported adverse reactions, including sudden death, but this may reflect greater use rather than greater risk.  Both oral and topical uses have been reported to cause anaphylaxis, including one case of anaphylaxis with cardiac arrest (resuscitated) following topical use in an eye drop. Reported rates of adverse reactions vary from 1% to 6%. The higher rates may reflect study populations that include a higher percentage of persons with prior adverse reactions.  The risk of an adverse reaction is 25 times higher if the person has had a prior adverse reaction.  The risk can be reduced with prior (prophylactic) use of antihistamines 
and prompt emergency management of any ensuing anaphylaxis.  A simple prick test may help to identify persons at greatest risk of adverse reaction.

Chemistry 

The fluorescence of this molecule is very intense; peak excitation occurs at 495 nm and peak emission at 520 nm. Values for the deprotonated form in basic solution.

Fluorescein has a pKa of 6.4, and its ionization equilibrium leads to pH-dependent absorption and emission over the range of 5 to 9. Also, the fluorescence lifetimes of the protonated and deprotonated forms of fluorescein are approximately 3 and 4 ns, which allows for pH determination from nonintensity based measurements. The lifetimes can be recovered using time-correlated single photon counting or phase-modulation fluorimetry. Upon exhaustive irradiation with visible light fluorescein decomposes to release phthalic and formic acids and carbon monoxide, effectively acting as a photoCORM.

Fluorescein has an isosbestic point (equal absorption for all pH values) at 460 nm.

Derivatives 

Many derivatives of fluorescein are known. Examples are:
fluorescein isothiocyanate 1, often abbreviated as FITC, features an isothiocyanate group (−N=C=S) substituent. FITC reacts with the amine groups of many biologically relevant compounds including intracellular proteins to form a thiourea linkage.  
succinimidyl ester modified fluorescein, i.e. NHS-fluorescein, is another common amine-reactive derivative, yielding amide adducts that are more stable than the aforementioned thioureas. 
Others: carboxyfluorescein, carboxyfluorescein succinimidyl ester, Pentafluorophenyl esters (PFP), tetrafluorophenyl esters (TFP) are other useful reagents.

In oligonucleotide synthesis, several phosphoramidite reagents containing protected fluorescein, e.g. 6-FAM phosphoramidite 2, are used for the preparation of fluorescein-labeled oligonucleotides.

The extent to which fluorescein dilaurate is broken down to yield lauric acid can be detected as a measure of pancreatic esterase activity.

Synthesis 
Approximately 250 tons/y were produced in the year 2000.  The method involves the fusion of phthalic anhydride and resorcinol, similar to the route described by Adolf von Baeyer in 1871. In some cases, acids such as zinc chloride and methanesulfonic acid are employed to accelerate the Friedel-Crafts reaction.

Research 
Fluorescein is a fluorophore commonly used in microscopy, in a type of dye laser as the gain medium, in forensics and serology to detect latent blood stains, and in dye tracing. Fluorescein has an absorption maximum at 494 nm and emission maximum of 512 nm (in water). The major derivatives are fluorescein isothiocyanate (FITC) and, in oligonucleotide synthesis, 6-FAM phosphoramidite.

Biosciences 

In cellular biology, the      isothiocyanate derivative of fluorescein is often used to label and track cells in fluorescence microscopy applications (for example, flow cytometry).  Additional biologically active molecules (such as antibodies) may also be attached to fluorescein, allowing biologists to target the fluorophore to specific proteins or structures within cells. This application is common in yeast display.

Fluorescein can also be conjugated to nucleoside triphosphates and incorporated into a probe enzymatically for in situ hybridisation. The use of fluorescein amidite, shown below right, allows one to synthesize labeled oligonucleotides for the same purpose. Yet another technique termed molecular beacons makes use of synthetic fluorescein-labeled oligonucleotides.  Fluorescein-labelled probes can be imaged using FISH, or targeted by antibodies using immunohistochemistry.  The latter is a common alternative to digoxigenin, and the two are used together for labelling two genes in one sample.

 
Intravenous or oral fluorescein is used in fluorescein angiography in research and to diagnose and categorize vascular disorders including retinal disease, macular degeneration, diabetic retinopathy, inflammatory intraocular conditions, and intraocular tumors. It is also being used increasingly during surgery for brain tumors.

Diluted fluorescein dye has been used to localise multiple muscular ventricular septal defects during open heart surgery and confirm the presence of any residual defects.

Earth sciences 
Fluorescein is used as a rather conservative flow tracer in hydrological tracer tests to help in understanding of water flow of both surface waters and groundwater. The dye can also be added to rainwater in environmental testing simulations to aid in locating and analyzing any water leaks, and in Australia and New Zealand as a methylated spirit dye.

As fluorescein solution changes its color depending on concentration, it has been used as a tracer in evaporation experiments.

One of its more recognizable uses was in the Chicago River, where fluorescein was the first substance used to dye the river green on St. Patrick's Day in 1962. In 1966, environmentalists forced a change to a vegetable-based dye to protect local wildlife.

Fluorescein dye solutions, typically 15% active, are commonly used as an aid to leak detection during hydrostatic testing of subsea oil and gas pipelines and other subsea infrastructure. Leaks can be detected by divers or ROVs carrying an ultraviolet light.

Plant science 
Fluorescein has often been used to track water movement in groundwater to study water flow and observe areas of contamination or obstruction in these systems. The fluorescence that is created by the dye makes problem areas more visible and easily identified. A similar concept can be applied to plants because the dye can make problems in plant vasculature more visible. In plant science, fluorescein, and other fluorescent dyes, have been used to monitor and study plant vasculature, particularly the xylem, which is the main water transportation pathway in plants. This is because fluorescein is xylem-mobile and unable to cross plasma membranes, making it particularly useful in tracking water movement through the xylem. Fluorescein can be introduced to a plant's veins through the roots or a cut stem. The dye is able to be taken up into the plant the same way as water and moves from the roots to the top of the plant due to a transpirational pull. The fluorescein that has been taken up into the plant can be visualized under a fluorescent microscope.

See also 
 Chemical derivatives of fluorescein:
 Eosin, group of dibromo, or tetrabromo, derivatives of fluorescein
 Calcein, fluorescent dye and complexometric indicator
 Fluorescein amidite (FAM), synthetic equivalents of fluorescein used in oligonucleotide synthesis
 Merbromin, or mercurochrome, organomercuric antiseptic
 Erythrosine, tetraiodofluorescein
 Rose bengal, tetrachloro-tetraiodo-fluorescein used as stain in histology
 DyLight Fluor, a product line of fluorescent dyes
 Fluorescein diacetate hydrolysis, a biochemistry laboratory test
 Other dyes:
 Rhodamine, family of derivatives of xanthene used as dyes, indicators and fluorescent tracers
 Methylene blue, blue thiazine dye also used as a medication
 Haematoxylin, natural stain derived from hearthwood and used in histology
 Laser dyes
 Precursor aromatic heterocyclic chromophore structures:
 Phenothiazine, the chromophore structure in methylene blue
 Xanthene, aromatic heterocyclic structure present in fluorescein
 Xanthone
 Xanthydrol

References

External links 

Absorption and Emission Spectra of Fluorescein in Ethanol and Basic Ethanol at OGI School of Science and Engineering
Fluorescein Ionization Equilibria at Invitrogen
Absorption spectra and fluorescence emission spectra

Benzoic acids
Fluorone dyes
Laser gain media
Maritime signalling
Phenols
Staining dyes
Triarylmethane dyes
Vinylogous carboxylic acids
Acid dyes